Elbert J. Drungo, Jr.  (April 30, 1943 – October 11, 2014) was an American football offensive lineman for one season in the American Football League for the Houston Oilers, then seven more seasons with the Oilers in the National Football League.  He finished his career with the Buffalo Bills.  Drungo played college football at Tennessee State University. He died of cancer in 2014.

References

1943 births
2014 deaths
People from Columbus, Mississippi
Players of American football from Mississippi
American football offensive guards
American football offensive tackles
Tennessee State Tigers football players
Houston Oilers players
Buffalo Bills players
American Football League players
People from Hermitage, Tennessee